The 2008 Friuli-Venezia Giulia regional election took place on 13–14 April 2008.

Former President Renzo Tondo (The People of Freedom) defeated incumbent Riccardo Illy (an independent closed to the Democratic Party).

Results

References

2008 elections in Italy
Elections in Friuli-Venezia Giulia
April 2008 events in Europe